Allen West (born October 17, 1967, Brandon, Florida, United States) is an American death metal guitarist, who has been a member of Massacre, Obituary, Six Feet Under, Lowbrow, Corpse Rot, and Southwicked. He is considered to be a pioneering figure of the death metal genre in the 1980s.

Musical career

West formed the band Massacre in 1983, while he was still in high school. West's second band was Xecutioner, which laid down the foundation of Obituary.

West founded Six Feet Under. Later vocalist Chris Barnes of Cannibal Corpse joined in 1993. Initially a side project for Barnes, it became a full-time band in early 1995 after his departure from Cannibal Corpse. West remained with the band until late 1997, recording two albums and an EP in his tenure. In 1998 West formed Lowbrow band. It was announced in January 2009 that Lowbrow has decided to disband at the conclusion of their European tour. He has been in the band Southwicked ever since.

Personal life
West has one son and resides in Florida.

On May 16, 2007 he was arrested and imprisoned after his fifth DUI offense, incarcerated at the Gainesville Correctional Institution and released on January 19, 2008.

In late March 2013, West was arrested for producing methamphetamine in his own home.  He was sentenced to one year, 3 months, and 15 days in prison on July 16, 2013, but was released April 20th 2014 having served less than nine months of his sentence.

On February 27, 2015, West was arrested in Sumter County Florida for petty theft. The case went to trial in May 2016, and as it was his third conviction he was sentenced to three years, ultimately being released October 7, 2018, having served two years and four months.

One year after being released, he was arrested yet again, in Citrus County Florida on December 18, 2019, for felony petit theft and misdemeanor resisting a merchant.

Discography
Obituary
 Slowly We Rot (1989)
 The End Complete (1992)
 World Demise (1994)
 Back from the Dead (1997)
 Frozen in Time (2005)
 Frozen Alive (DVD) (2007)

Six Feet Under
 Haunted (1995)
 Alive and Dead (1996)
 Warpath (1997)

Lowbrow
 Victims at Play (2000)
 Sex, Death, Violence (2003)

Southwicked
 Death's Crown (2011)

References

1967 births
20th-century American guitarists
20th-century American male musicians
American heavy metal guitarists
American male guitarists
Death metal musicians
Guitarists from Florida
Obituary (band) members
Massacre (metal band) members
People from Brandon, Florida
Lead guitarists
Living people
Musicians from Tampa, Florida
Six Feet Under (band) members